Aiea is a census-designated place (CDP) located in the City and County of Honolulu, Hawaii, United States. As of the 2010 Census, the CDP had a total population of 9,338.

Geography 
Aiea is located at  (21.385900, −157.930927).

Kamehameha Highway (Hawaii Route 99) divides most of Aiea from the shore of Pearl Harbor (mostly US government property), and the parallel major thoroughfare, Interstate H-1, further cuts the town's commercial district into two distinct areas.  These east–west routes (and other streets, such as Moanalua Road) connect Aiea to Pearl City, immediately adjacent on the west, and Halawa, adjacent on the east. The residential area known as Aiea Heights extends up the ridgeline above the town. The communities of Newtown Estates and Royal Summit are located at the western edge of Aiea near its border with Pearl City at Kaahumanu Street. Residents of the census-designated places (CDP) of Waimalu and Hālawa use Aiea in their postal address.

Climate

History 

"Aiea" was originally the name of an ahupuaa, or Hawaiian land division. The name was derived from a species of plant in the nightshade family, Nothocestrum latifolium. It stretched from Aiea Bay (part of Pearl Harbor) into the mountains to the north. At the end of the 19th century, a sugarcane plantation was opened in the district by the Honolulu Plantation Company.

Despite several major searches and a naval investigation, his disappearance has never been explained. Within the U.S. Navy, many believed he might have been abducted and killed by a local Hawaiian Japanese spy ring because he had either stumbled upon their activities in the hills or had been specifically targeted because of his background in Naval Intelligence.

On December 7, 1941, a large part of the Japanese attack focused on the military installations around the town and the ships moored off shore. For example, one damaged ship, beached in Aiea Bay to prevent sinking. Many people photographed the attack from the hills in Aiea. Part of Naval Base Hawaii was built in Aiea, including the Aiea Naval Hospital and the Nimitz Bowl.

After World War II the plantation shut down and the mill was converted into a sugar refinery. Meanwhile, developers started extending the town into the surrounding former sugarcane fields. In the years since then, Aiea has grown into an important suburb of Honolulu. The town's sugar history came to a close in 1996, when C&H Sugar closed the refinery. Then in 1998, the 99-year-old sugar mill was torn down by the owners, amid protests from town residents and the County government.

Singer and actress Bette Midler was raised in Aiea.

Demographics 

As of the census of 2000, there were 9,019 people, 2,758 households, and 2,258 families residing in the CDP. The racial makeup of the CDP was 16.25% White, 0.85% Black or African American, 0.14% Native American, 58.31% Asian, 5.08% Pacific Islander, 0.77% from other races, and 18.59% from two or more races.  5.47% of the population were Hispanic or Latino of any race.

There were 2,758 households, out of which 27.3% had children under the age of 18 living with them, 63.0% were married couples living together, 13.3% had a female householder with no husband present, and 18.1% were non-families. 13.9% of all households were made up of individuals, and 7.7% had someone living alone who was 65 years of age or older.  The average household size was 3.24 and the average family size was 3.51.

In the CDP the population was spread out, with 21.2% under the age of 18, 6.4% from 18 to 24, 27.6% from 25 to 44, 23.1% from 45 to 64, and 21.7% who were 65 years of age or older.  The median age was 42 years.  For every 100 females there were 96.3 males.  For every 100 females age 18 and over, there were 96.0 males.

The median income for a household in the CDP was $71,155, and the median income for a family was $75,992. Males had a median income of $41,384 versus $32,394 for females. The per capita income for the CDP was $25,111.  4.6% of the population and 3.4% of families were below the poverty line.  Out of the total population, 8.1% of those under the age of 18 and 4.0% of those 65 and older were living below the poverty line.

Attractions
Aiea is the home of Pearlridge, Hawaii's largest enclosed shopping center and second largest shopping center in the state. The mall is separated into two sections, known as Uptown and Downtown, and includes a monorail. There is a hospital located on mall property (Pali Momi Medical Center), and Hawaii's largest watercress farm (Sumida Farm).

Aloha Stadium, formerly home of the University of Hawaii Warriors football team, and the host site for the Hawaii Bowl every Christmas Eve and the National Football League's Pro Bowl every February (except in ), was located in the adjacent Halawa CDP.

Aiea is home to Keaiwa Heiau, an ancient medicine shrine. There is a  loop trail. A World War II plane crashed in the trail and can be seen halfway through.

Aiea is also home to Aiea Shopping Center. The center's anchor stores include Times Supermarkets, McDonald's, Starbucks, and Jamba Juice. Aiea Chop Suey, Aiea Copy Center, Koa Pancake House, and L&L Drive inn are other businesses located in the center as well.

Government and infrastructure
The United States Postal Service operates the Aiea Post Office.

The Hawaii Department of Public Safety operates the Halawa Correctional Facility in an area near Aiea.

Camp H. M. Smith, headquarters of the United States Pacific Command, is located in Aiea.

Education
All areas of Hawaii are served by public schools of the Hawaii Department of Education.

Alvah A. Scott Elementary School is in the Aiea CDP. Aiea and Gus Webling elementary schools are in the adjacent Halawa CDP. Pearl Ridge Elementary School is in the Waimalu CDP. Waimalu Elementary School was in Waimalu CDP in 2000, but in 2010 is now in Pearl City CDP.

Aiea Intermediate School is in Halawa CDP, and Aiea High School are the secondary schools in the Aiea CDP.

Private schools in the area include St. Elizabeth Catholic School (of the Roman Catholic Diocese of Honolulu) in Aiea CDP, and Our Savior Lutheran School (LCMS) in Waimalu CDP (Aiea address), both of which are K-8 schools.

References

 
Census-designated places in Honolulu County, Hawaii
Sugar plantations in Hawaii